Paris Métro Line 3 (French: Ligne 3 du métro de Paris) is one of the sixteen lines of the Paris Métro. It connects Pont de Levallois–Bécon station in the near northwestern suburbs to Gallieni in the east, where Paris's international bus station is located. After opening as the network's third line in 1904, it was the subject of a number of extensions, with a major restructuring occurring in the eastern section in 1971, with an extension to Gallieni and the conversion of the original terminal branch to Line 3bis.

In 2017, it carried 101.4 million riders, making it the tenth busiest line of the Métro network.

History

Chronology
10 October 1904: The first portion of Line 3 was opened between Père Lachaise cemetery and Villiers. Work took longer than expected because of existing infrastructure.
25 January 1905: The line was extended in the east from Père Lachaise to Gambetta.
23 May 1910: The line was extended westbound from Villiers to Pereire.
15 February 1911: The line was extended from Pereire to Porte de Champerret.
27 November 1921: The line was extended eastbound from Gambetta to Porte des Lilas.
24 September 1937: The line was extended from Porte de Champerret to Pont de Levallois.
1967: Line 3 was the first Métro line to receive new MF 67 rolling stock. It still uses this stock which was refurbished in the 2000s.
23 August 1969: Gambetta station is remodelled, absorbing nearby Martin Nadaud station.
23 March 1971: The branch between Gambetta and Porte des Lilas was separated from the line to become the independent Line 3bis.
2 April 1971: The line was extended from Gambetta to Gallieni.

A second east–west axis

The infrastructure works for Line 3 were auctioned off in six sections on 24 May 1902. The concession was granted to the CMP by the municipal government of Paris on 13 March 1903, but the declaration of public utility was only granted on 26 February 1907.

The works were rendered difficult due to the necessary displacement of existing underground infrastructure such as water, gas, and electricity lines, but also because the Line 3 was to cross a number of Métro lines, particularly at Opéra, where a special pit was built to house the intersection of Lines 3, 7, and 8. Since the work was situated at the water table, it required concrete pillars made by sinking caissons with compressed air. The work lasted eleven months, from March 1903 to February 1904.

Another difficult point of construction was the crossing of the Canal Saint-Martin. To build underneath it, the canal was dried and its vault hanged. In the area of the Place Gambetta, because of the instability of the subsoil, which consisted of waterlogged sand balls, made it necessary to drain the soil, a very delicate operation considering the number of buildings that could be destabilised.  Then the side walls were built from masonry shafts that are dark from the outside.

Future plans
Although no funded plans for an extension of Line 3 currently exist, Line 3bis may be merged with Line 7bis to form a new line, possibly named Line 19, which Line 3 would then connect to.

Map and stations

Renamed stations
15 October 1907: Rue St-Denis renamed Réaumur-Sébastopol.
1926: Caumartin renamed Havre-Caumartin
1 May 1946: Vallier renamed Louise Michel in honour of the leader of the "La Commune".
September 1998: Saint-Maur is renamed Rue Saint-Maur in order to avoid confusion with the suburb of Saint-Maur-les-Fossées.

Facts
Due to connections with other adjacent stations, it is possible to walk between three stations on the line without heading to the surface. This is done by starting at Saint-Lazare (Métro 3, 12, 13 and 14), then transferring to Hausmann Saint-Lazare station (RER E), from there going to Havre – Caumartin (Métro 3 and 9) then connecting to Auber (RER A) and finally walking from there to Opéra (Métro 3, 7 and 8). The journey can also be made the other way round (Opéra to Saint-Lazare)

Tourism
Line 3 passes near several places of interest :
St-Lazare railway station.
The Opera Garnier.
The Bourse (Paris Stock Exchange).
The area of the Sentier.
Place de la République.
Père Lachaise Cemetery.

Gallery

See also

External links

  RATP official website
  RATP english speaking website
  Interactive Map of the RER (from RATP's website)
  Interactive Map of the Paris métro (from RATP's website)
  Mobidf website, dedicated to the RER (unofficial)
  Metro-Pole website, dedicated to Paris public transports (unofficial)

 
Railway lines opened in 1904